Mark Nelson is a professional boxing referee from St. Paul, Minnesota.  Nelson is licensed by the WBO, WBA, and IBF, and has been appointed to officiate over 100 world title fights.

Notes

American boxing referees
Living people
People from Maplewood, Minnesota
Sportspeople from Minnesota
Year of birth missing (living people)
American male boxers